Stefan Krook (born 1 October 1950) is a Swedish sailor.  He won a silver medal at the 1972 Summer Olympics and a gold medal at the World Championship 1970, as well as at the European Championship 1975 in the Soling Class. He has also won 2 bronze medals at the World Championships 1973 and 1979, and several Nordic and Swedish Championship gold medals in the Soling Class.

References
 Profile at sports-reference.com

1950 births
Living people
European Champions Soling
Medalists at the 1972 Summer Olympics
Olympic medalists in sailing
Olympic sailors of Sweden
Olympic silver medalists for Sweden
Sailors at the 1972 Summer Olympics – Soling
Sportspeople from Gothenburg
Swedish male sailors (sport)
Soling class world champions